Ward No. 144, Kolkata Municipal Corporation is an administrative division of the Kolkata Municipal Corporation in Borough No. 16, covering parts of the Joka neighbourhood in the Indian state of West Bengal.

History
Wards No. 142, 143 and 144, in Joka, were created in 2012 and subsequently brought under Borough No. 16. The area of the newly created wards was earlier part of Joka I and Joka II gram panchayats.

Election highlights
The ward forms a city municipal corporation council electoral constituency and is a part of Behala Purba (Vidhan Sabha constituency)

References

Municipal wards of Kolkata